The Ultimates 2 is a thirteen-issue comic book limited series written by Mark Millar with art by Bryan Hitch, the sequel to The Ultimates. The series features the superhero team the Ultimates and was published by the Ultimate Marvel imprint of Marvel Comics.

Publication history
The series debuted in December 2004 and was completed in May 2007.

Millar stated in Pop Culture Shock that this arc reflected contemporary issues, ranging from hyper-powered countries like the USA, preemptive strikes, the rising world-wide anti-American sentiment in the wake of the Neo-Conservative Bush Doctrine, and the "rogue nation" classification and the fear of backlash in form of nuclear Armageddon. Millar said: "In the name of oil, this administration is stirring up a hornet's nest . . . . My own belief is that there'll be a couple of nuclear attacks in the States, the multinationals will move elsewhere, the American economy will completely collapse and make the 30s look like the 80s and the Middle East will be occupied by drafted teenagers from your home town. . . . I hope I'm completely and utterly wrong."
	
Bryan Hitch has described completing the final issue of Ultimates 2 by saying, "The bane of my life for the last five years is gone from my day to day routine." He describes the job as difficult, but stated that no prior job in his then-twenty years in the business was "so creatively rewarding, so time-consuming and so fulfilling".

Plot synopsis
A year after the end of The Ultimates public opinion has turned against the team when it is discovered that Bruce Banner is in fact the Hulk and was responsible for hundreds of deaths. The team is undermined further when Thor is accused of being an escaped mental patient and is incarcerated. This is the doing of his brother Loki, who also facilitates the creation of a new team of anti-American multi-nationals called the Liberators. With the aid of the Black Widow - who betrays the team to the Liberators - the Liberators conquer the United States and capture the Ultimates, but the Ultimates eventually escape. With the aid of Asgardian warriors and American and European heroes, the Ultimates defeat both Loki and the Liberators.

Reception
Lance Eaton from curledup.com reviewed the first story arc Gods and Monsters. He praises Millar's writing of the classic heroes and states that the "inclusion of current-day politics" improves the storyline.
	
Kevin Powers from comicsbulletin.com reviewed the final issue #13 but found it anticlimactic with the issue degenerating to a "slug fest". Powers praised with art, however, stating that Bryan Hitch's "artwork has definitely been one of the main elements that will make this series memorable." Similarly Robert Mclaughlin from denofgeek.com praised the artwork, with "Bryan Hitch doing some of the best work of his career". He was critical of the Millar's writing stating it had "no substance".

Collected editions

Sequels
The series was followed by The Ultimates 3.

See also
Ultimates
The Ultimates (comic book)
Tomorrow Men

References

External links

Ultimates 2, The
Widescreen comics
Ultimates